Embsay Priory was a medieval monastic house in North Yorkshire, England.   

The priory was founded in 1120 in Embsay in Wharfedale. It was dedicated to St Mary and St Cuthbert and was part of the Augustinian order. William de Meschines and his wife Cecily endowed the priory and the churches in Skipton and Carleton.  

St Mary the Virgin's Church (Embsay with Eastby) stands on the site of the former priory.

References

Monasteries in North Yorkshire